The 2013 Speedway Grand Prix season was the 68th edition of the official World Championship and the 19th season of the Speedway Grand Prix era, deciding the FIM Speedway World Championship. It was the thirteenth series under the promotion of Benfield Sports International, an IMG company.

The British rider Tai Woffinden became world champion, making him the first British rider to win the gold medal since Mark Loram in the 2000 Speedway Grand Prix. Jarosław Hampel won his third world championship medal, while Danish rider Niels Kristian Iversen won his first medal finishing third in the series.

Qualification 
For the 2013 season there were 15 permanent riders, joined at each Grand Prix by one wild card and two track reserves.

Since Jason Crump decided to retire from the series, the top eight riders – except Crump, who was replaced by ninth-placed Andreas Jonsson – from the 2012 championship qualified. Those riders were joined by three riders who qualified via the Grand Prix Challenge.

The final four riders were nominated by series promoters, Benfield Sports International, following the completion of the 2012 season.

Qualified riders

Qualified substitutes 

The following riders qualified as substitutes due to their results in the Grand Prix Challenge.

Crump spot controversy 

Before the Toruń event in 2012, former three-times World Champion, Jason Crump announced his retirement at the end of the 2012 season.

According to the SGP Regulation, Crump's spot for the 2013 season – as sixth place in 2012 – should be taken by the first Qualified Substitute, Aleš Dryml, Jr. However, BSI has announced that Crump's spot would be awarded to Andreas Jonsson, the ninth-place finisher in the 2012 standings, per FIM regulations.

Calendar 

The 2013 season will consist of 12 events, just like the 2012 Speedway Grand Prix.

Classification

See also 
 2013 Individual Speedway Junior World Championship

References

External links 
 SpeedwayGP.com – Speedway World Championships

 
2013
Grand Prix